The Food Network Awards are a United States television production awards ceremony, focused on giving awards to chefs, cities, restaurants, and other notable food related institutions.

The first ever Food Network Awards took place as part of the Food Network South Beach Wine and Food Festival in Miami on February 23, 2007. Emeril Lagasse served as Master of Ceremonies for this awards show honoring achievements in the world of food and entertaining. The event was taped live at the festival and aired on the Food Network April 15, 2007.

Categories
 Favorite Comfort Food Combo (Viewers’ Choice)
 Most Delicious Destination
 Best Ball Park Eats (Viewers’ Choice)
 Play With Your Food: Artwork With an Edible Twist
 Icy Innovations, awarded to innovators in the world of frozen treats
 Tasty Technology, (as above)
 Professional Grade Kitchen Appliance You Can't Live Without (Viewers’ Choice)
 Hot Chocolate List
 Food Hall of Fame: Tribute to Julia Child, television and food pioneer
 Share Our Strength Food Humanitarian Award
 Culinary Dreams Can Come True
 Favorite Childhood Classics (Viewers’ Choice)
 Not Your Grandmother's Food of the Month Club, given to the most unusual food of the month club
 SUPER Market
 Best Better Burger
 Favorite Coolest Cocktail (Viewers’ Choice)
 Edible Entrepreneurs
 Funniest Food Festival

See also
 Food Network

American television awards
Food and drink awards
Food Network